Dunstan Ainani was an Anglican bishop in Malawi.

Ainani studied for the priesthood at St Andrew's College, Malawi. He was ordained in 1967 and served in the Diocese of Malawi. He was consecrated Suffragan Bishop of Malawi in 1979; and Bishop of Southern Malawi in 1981.

References

Anglican bishops of Southern Malawi
20th-century Anglican bishops in Malawi